Plukenetiinae is one of three subtribes of plant of tribe Plukenetieae.

Plukenetieae
Plant subtribes